UFC on Fuel TV: Gustafsson vs. Silva (also known as UFC on Fuel TV 2 or UFC: Sweden) was a mixed martial arts event held by the Ultimate Fighting Championship on April 14, 2012 at the Ericsson Globe Arena in Stockholm, Sweden.

Background
This was the first UFC event held in Sweden, and was the fastest selling European event in UFC history, selling out in three hours.

The preliminary card for this event streamed live on Facebook.

A rematch between Ross Pearson and Dennis Siver at featherweight was briefly linked to this event.  However, Siver instead faced Diego Nunes.

Mike Goldberg did play by play for this event in place of Jon Anik due to scheduling issues.

Akira Corassani was expected to face Jason Young at the event, but Corassani pulled out of the bout with an undisclosed injury and was replaced by Eric Wisely.

Antônio Rogério Nogueira was expected to face Alexander Gustafsson at this event but pulled out due to injury. His replacement was Thiago Silva.

Jorgen Kruth was expected to face Cyrille Diabate at the event but pulled out of the bout with an injury, Tom DeBlass stepped in for Kruth and fought Diabate.

Results

Bonus awards
Fighters were awarded $50,000 bonuses.

Fight of the Night: Brad Pickett vs. Damacio Page
Knockout of the Night: Siyar Bahadurzada
Submission of the Night: John Maguire

See also

List of UFC events
2012 in UFC

References

UFC on Fuel TV
2012 in mixed martial arts
Mixed martial arts in Sweden
Sport in Stockholm
2012 in Swedish sport
2010s in Stockholm